South Chotanagpur division is one of the five divisions in the Indian state of Jharkhand. The division comprises the following districts: Gumla, Khunti, Lohardaga, Ranchi and Simdega.

It has a population of 5,532,719.

Languages

References

Divisions of Jharkhand